Teaching artists, also known as artist educators or community artists, are professional artists who supplement their incomes by teaching and integrating their art form, perspectives, and skills into a wide range of settings. Teaching artists work with schools, after school programs, community agencies, prisons, jails, and social service agencies. The Arts In Education movement benefited from the work of teaching artists in schools.

Arts learning consultant Eric Booth has defined a teaching artist as "a practicing professional artist with the complementary skills, curiosities and sensibilities of an educator, who can effectively engage a wide range of people in learning experiences in, through, and about the arts.” This term applies to professional artists in all artistic fields. Teaching artists have worked in schools and in communities for many decades.

See also
Artist
Teacher

References

Further reading
Gielen, Pascal and De Bruyne Paul, (2011), Teaching Art in the Neoliberal Realm. Realism versus Cynicism. Valiz: Amsterdam. 

Visual arts education
Arts occupations
Education and training occupations